"Face the Day" is a song by Australian hard rock The Angels, released in October 1980 as the third and final single from their fourth studio album Dark Room.  The single charted at number 30 on the Recorded Music NZ and number 67 on the Kent Music Report.

The song was covered by American hard rock band Great White on their 1986 album Shot In the Dark, and was the first single released from that album.

Track listing 
 EPIC ES510
 Face the Day (Doc Neeson, John Brewster, Richard Brewster) - 4:07
 Public Enemy (Doc Neeson, John Brewster, Richard Brewster, Chris Bailey) - 2:58

Personnel 
 Doc Neeson - lead vocals
 Rick Brewster - lead guitar
 John Brewster - rhythm guitar
 Chris Bailey - bass guitar
 Graham "Buzz" Bidstrup - drums
Production
 Producer - John Brewster, Richard Brewster (tracks: 1 & 2)

Charts

References 

The Angels (Australian band) songs
1980 singles
1980 songs
Songs written by Doc Neeson
Songs written by John Brewster (musician)
Epic Records singles